Paraceratites subnodosus is an extinct species of ammonite cephalopods in the family Ceratitidae.

Distribution
Fossils of Paraceratites subnodosus are found in the Triassic marine strata of China, Hungary, Israel and Italy.

References
 The Paleobiology Database
 Zipcodezoo
 Global Names Index

Triassic cephalopods
Ceratitidae
Fossil taxa described in 1882